A gubernatorial election was held on 5 february 2006 to elect the next governor of , a prefecture of Japan in the north-west of the island of Kyushu.

Candidates 
Genjiro Kaneko, 61-year-old incumbent (first elected in 1998), endorsed by LDP, New Komeito and SDP.
Noriko Kokubo, a 47-year-old company executive. 
Mitsuaki Yamashita, 53, chairman of the JCP's Nagasaki chapter.

Results

References 

2006 elections in Japan
Nagasaki gubernational elections